General elections were held in the Cook Islands in May 1961.

Electoral system
The 27 members of the Legislative Assembly consisted of 15 directly elected members (14 from ten general constituencies and one from a European voter constituency), seven members indirectly elected by Island Councils (four from Rarotonga and one from Aitutaki, Atiu and Mangaia), and five officials members, including the Resident Commissioner as President of the Assembly, the Administration Secretary, the Treasurer and two members appointed by the Resident Commissioner.

Results

Appointed members

Aftermath

In 1962 an Executive Committee was established, with its members elected by the Assembly. It initially consisted of Les Bailey, Dick Charles Brown, William Estall, Ngatupuna Matepi, Vainerere Tangatapoto, Tangaroa Tangaroa and Teariki Tuavera, together with the Government Secretary and the Treasurer. 

By-elections in 1963 saw Dick Rapley elected to replace Les Bailey for the European seat (Bailey was also replaced on the Executive Committee by Napa Tauei Napa), Julian Dashwood becoming the MLA for Mauke and David Marama Hosking becoming an MLA for Ratotonga, replacing Teupoko'ina Morgan after she emigrated to New Zealand

In November 1963 the Executive Committee was revamped, becoming a "shadow cabinet" with defined portfolios. Dick Charles Brown was elected the first Leader of Government business, defeating Ngatupuna Matepi by a vote of 11–10. A new speaker was also appointed, with Teariki Tuavera defeating Ngatapuna Matepi in a secret ballot.

References

Cook Islands
Elections in the Cook Islands
1961 in the Cook Islands
May 1961 events in Oceania